70mm Entertainments is an Indian film production company established in 2015, which predominantly works in Telugu Cinema.

History

Producers Vijay Chilla and Shashi Devireddy has established this production house in 2015. In the same year, they produced Bhale Manchi Roju, a crime comedy starring Sudheer Babu, Wamiqa Gabbi and Sai Kumar. Bhale Manchi Roju did well at the box-office and also received good reviews from critics.

Later in 2017, they were back after a year with Anando Brahma a comedy horror. Despite being a Small-Budget Movie did exceptionally well grossing around ₹15 crore and made it to the list of hits in 2017.

They teamed up for the second time with Mahi V Raghav for the biopic of former Chief Minister of Andhra Pradesh Y. S. Rajasekhara Reddy titled as Yatra.

Film production

References 

Film production companies based in Hyderabad, India
2015 establishments in Telangana
Indian companies established in 2015